Perugia is a city in central Italy, the capital of Umbria.

Perugia may also refer to:

Art, entertainment, and media
 Cippus of Perugia, a stone tablet bearing an Etruscan inscription
 "From Perugia", a poem by American Quaker poet John Greenleaf Whittier
  Perugia (album), a 1974 jazz album by American pianist Roland Hanna
 Polyptych of Perugia, a Renaissance painting by Italian artist Piero della Francesca

Military 
 151 Infantry Division Perugia, an Italian infantry division of World War II
 Battle of Perugia, an ancient Roman battle

People 
 André Perugia (1893-1977), French shoe designer
 Andrew of Perugia (died c. 1332), Franciscan friar and bishop
 Constantius of Perugia (died c. 170 AD), Christian martyr, bishop, and saint
 Giannicolo da Perugia (c. 1460–1544), Italian painter during the Renaissance
 Herculanus of Perugia (died 549 AD), bishop of Perugia and Christian martyr
 Ilaria Perugia (born 1969), Italian mathematician
 John of Perugia and Peter of Sassoferrato (13th century), Franciscan friars
 Matteo da Perugia (fl. 1400–1416), Medieval Italian composer
 Niccolò da Perugia (fl. 14th century), Italian composer of the "ars nova"
 Paul of Perugia (14th century), Italian mythographer
 Vincenzo Perugia (1881–1925), the man who stole the Mona Lisa

Places
 Duchy of Perugia, a duchy in the Italian part of the Byzantine Empire
 Province of Perugia, Umbria, Italy

Other uses 
 A.C. Perugia Calcio, an Italian football (soccer) club based in Perugia
 Cippus of Perugia, a stone tablet discovered near Perugia, Italy, in 1822
 Perugia Cathedral, Perugia, Italy
 Perugia Press, an American poetry press
 Perugia's limia, a small fish of the family Poeciliidae
 University of Perugia, Perugia, Italy